Charles Arthur "Yank" Bernier (July 21, 1890 – June 20, 1963) was an American football, basketball, and baseball player, coach, and college administrator. He served as the head football coach at Hampden–Sydney College from 1912 to 1916 and again from 1923 to 1938 and at Virginia Agricultural and Mechanical College and Polytechnic Institute (VPI)—now known as Virginia Tech— from 1917 to 1919, compiling a career college football record of 87–106–18. Bernier was also the head basketball coach at Hampden–Sydney (1912–1917, 1923–1940), Virginia Tech (1917–1920), and the University of Alabama (1920–1923), amassing a career college basketball record of 242–219. In addition, he was the head baseball coach at the University of New Hampshire (1912), Virginia Tech (1918–1920), and Alabama (1921–1923), tallying a career college baseball record of 67–65–4. Bernier also served as the athletic director at Alabama from 1920 to 1923.

Bernier played football, basketball, and baseball at Hampden–Sydney. He was the first student-athlete to be named captain of all three sports. He also attended VPI and compete in sports there. Bernier is a member of the Hampden–Sydney Sports Hall of Fame. The school's baseball is named after him. He died on June 20, 1963 at his home in Cottondale, Alabama.

Head coaching record

Football

References 

1890 births
1963 deaths
American men's basketball coaches
Alabama Crimson Tide athletic directors
Alabama Crimson Tide baseball coaches
Alabama Crimson Tide football coaches
Alabama Crimson Tide men's basketball coaches
College men's basketball head coaches in the United States
Hampden–Sydney Tigers athletic directors
Hampden–Sydney Tigers baseball coaches
Hampden–Sydney Tigers baseball players
Hampden–Sydney Tigers basketball coaches
Hampden–Sydney Tigers basketball players
Hampden–Sydney Tigers football coaches
Hampden–Sydney Tigers football players
New Hampshire Wildcats baseball coaches
Virginia Tech Hokies baseball coaches
Virginia Tech Hokies football coaches
Virginia Tech Hokies football players
Virginia Tech Hokies men's basketball coaches
American men's basketball players